David Paul Mancuso (October 20, 1944 – November 14, 2016) was an American disc jockey who created the popular "by invitation only" parties in New York City, which later became known as "The Loft". The first party, called "Love Saves The Day", was in 1970.

Mancuso pioneered the private party, as distinct from the more commercial nightclub business model. In the early 1970s, Mancuso won a long administrative trial when the New York City Department of Consumer Affairs found that he was not selling food or beverages to the public and therefore did not need a New York City cabaret license.

Mancuso's success at keeping his parties "underground" and legal inspired others, and many famous private discothèques of the 1970s and 1980s were modeled after The Loft, including the Paradise Garage, The Gallery, 12 West, The Flamingo and later The Saint. Mancuso also helped start the record pool system for facilitating the distribution of promotional records to the qualified disc jockey.

Biography

Early life 
Mancuso was born on October 20, 1944 in Utica, New York. He was born out of wedlock while his mother's husband was serving in World War II and lived in an orphanage for the first five years of his life. Although he nominally resided with his mother thereafter, he remained a frequent runaway and spent a year in reform school as a teenager; during this period, he cultivated an interest in early rhythm and blues music.

He dropped out of high school on his 16th birthday and worked as a dishwasher for two years to finance his move to New York City in 1962. Over the next several years, he was employed in a variety of capacities (including stints as head of Holt Rinehart Winston's Xerox department and as a personnel manager for Restaurant Associates) before pursuing a career as an independent antiques dealer.

Career 

Mancuso continued to develop a highly variegated social network (a characteristic that he ascribed to his unconventional upbringing), frequenting rent parties in such disparate milieus as Harlem and Staten Island, while also immersing himself in the hippie culture of the era at such East Village venues as the Electric Circus, the Planetarium, and the Fillmore East (where he was present for notable performances by Timothy Leary and Nina Simone). He became an ardent devotee of Leary's The Psychedelic Experience (1966) after his initial experiments with LSD.

Before hosting his first Loft party at his home at 647 Broadway in 1970, Mancuso was playing records for his friends on a semi-regular basis as early as 1966. These parties became so popular that by 1971, he and Steve Abramowitz, who worked the door, decided to do this on a weekly basis. These parties were similar to rent parties or house parties.

Mancuso's first major Loft party, called "Love Saves The Day", was held Saturday, February 14, 1970, at his home, at 647 Broadway. The importance of Mancuso and The Loft are also chronicled in Josell Ramos' documentary, Maestro (2003), a Paradise Garage and Levan-centered narrative of New York dance music culture in the 1970s and 1980s.

In 1999 and 2000, Mancuso and Colleen 'Cosmo' Murphy produced the compilation series David Mancuso Presents The Loft, Volumes One and Two on Nuphonic.

In 2003, British journalist and lecturer Tim Lawrence published an influential and comprehensive study of the New York roots of modern dance music culture that placed Mancuso at its narrative center. Entitled Love Saves the Day: A History of American Dance Music Culture, 1970–1979, the book highlights the influence of Mancuso's late 1960s and early 1970s Loft parties on every major figure in the New York dance music scene, including Robert Williams, the founder of Chicago's Warehouse and Muzic Box; Frankie Knuckles, the DJ at the Warehouse, Nicky Siano, the founder of the Gallery; Larry Levan, the DJ at the Paradise Garage; Tony Humphries, the founder of Zanzibar; among numerous others.

On September 19, 2005, Mancuso was inducted into the Dance Music Hall of Fame for his outstanding achievement as a DJ.

On December 23, 2006, a nightclub named after Mancuso opened in Tübingen, in southern Germany.

In May 2008, Mancuso, with the help of Goshi Manabe, Colleen Murphy, and Satoru Ogawa, launched his own audiophile record label, The Loft Audiophile Library of Music. The music is mastered by Stan Ricker.

Death 
Mancuso died at his home in Manhattan on November 14, 2016.

References

 Lawrence, T. (2003). Love Saves the Day: A History of American Dance Music Culture 1970–1979. Durham, NC: Duke University Press.

External links

David Mancuso interview at DiscoMusic.com

1944 births
2016 deaths
Club DJs
DJs from New York City
LGBT DJs
People from Utica, New York
LGBT people from New York (state)
21st-century LGBT people
American people of Italian descent